The Grose was an English automobile built between 1898 and 1901, Grose also built bodies for cars, buses, ambulances and commercial vehicles until the late 1950s.

Company History 
Mr. Joseph G. Grose began work as a leather currier in Ambush Street, St. James' End, Northampton. He took an interest in cycle racing and held several national records before becoming a cycle repairer and maker. In 1897 he invented the Grose patent gear case made of leather that covered the cycle's driving mechanism to protect ladies' skirts from catching in the chain. This sold in large numbers and was so successful that the Grose Gear Case Company Ltd. was formed in July 1897 to manufacture it. The case was later used to cover the drive chain of early motor cars.

He was sufficiently successful to be able in 1897 to run the first motor car in the town, a Coventry Motette. Following this he bought six Benz engines and fitted them to his own chassis and sold them as the Grose-Benz. An advert in 1902 describes a car built by Grose Ltd as a 4-seater dog-cart fitted with 3HP genuine Benz engine and walnut body. Connolly solid tyres back wheel, pneumatic front. Price patent brakes, Coventry chains, basket luggage carrier. "This car is fitted with three speeds and will climb any hill in England".

In February 1900 the Company's name was changed to Grose Ltd and the gearcase business was sold and the factory in Pike Lane, Northampton was adapted to manufacture "Grose" Steel Studded Non-Skid Tyres, which Joseph Grose had invented for his newly built motor cars.

The business continued to expand moving into motorcycle sales and repairs, coachbuilding, commercial vehicle building and operating. A fleet of taxi-cabs was purchased in 1908 and operated from Pike Lane, the first motor taxi-cabs in Northampton. In 1912 Grose Ltd. registered a subsidiary company, Northampton Motor Omnibus Co. Ltd. operating local routes until
1928. Many of their buses had Grose-built bodies.

In 1924 Grose took over the works of the Croft Motor Carriage Works Ltd on Kingsthorpe Road which had gone into voluntary liquidation, and this became the centre for his coachbuilding business.

As well as producing some individual car bodies the company specialised in short production runs of standard designs. The first designs were for a two seat and dickey sports body and were first fitted to the Alvis 12/40 and 12/50 models.

In the 1930s Grose was listed as an approved coachbuilder by several major manufacturers including Rover with the Kingsley drophead coupe and Vauxhall, and the Sywell body fitted to the Alvis Firefly. In 1935 the Riley Motor Company was added with two drophead designs called the Burcote and the Horton. The names were taken from Northamptonshire villages.

In the late 1920s Joseph Grose's children entered the business with Will Grose as Managing Director, Frank Grose as Sales Director and Kate as Company Secretary. Joseph died in 1939 and his children continued to run the Company.

The company took a stand at the London Motor show for many years with their final appearance in 1936.

Car body making continued until 1939 and commercial bodies until 1959, though the Kingsthorpe coachworks wasn't sold until 1969.

Grose was purchased by Bristol Street Motors in 2012 (approx)

Cars with Grose bodies
The  following lists examples for which there is a photographic record in the Northampton archives.

Buses, coaches and commercial vehicles with Grose bodies
The manufacture of bus and coach bodies started with the acquisition of the Kingsthorpe works in 1924, and continued until WW2. While many of the bodies were made for the Grose-owned Northampton Motor Omnibus Company in the period up to 1928 (and after it had been sold), many smaller coaches of 20 to 30 seats were made for different operators. However production also included Guy 54 seater double-decker bus bodies exhibited at the Commercial Motor Show in 1929, and supplied to Northampton Corporation Transport in 1930/1931.

The last time a Grose bodied coach was exhibited at the Commercial Vehicle Show was in 1937, when Thornycroft showed their new Beautyride, based on a modified Thornycroft Sturdy chassis with a 26-seater luxury body by Grose offering "a high degree of comfort to the passengers".

Commercial vehicle body production started in 1924 alongside the buses and coaches, but continued at a lower level after WW2. Production appears to have been bespoke designs for individual customers. Grose also built some ambulance bodies based on a Commer chassis (1935), Bedford chassis (1937), Rolls-Royce (1938), Vauxhall (1939) and during the war were involved in converting vehicles for ambulance duties and for mobile first aid.

Post-war bodies included a Bedford-based travelling library and a mobile shop, hard top body and truck body for the Land Rover (1950/1951), and a Bedford-based show van for Exide batteries in 1958.

See also
 List of car manufacturers of the United Kingdom

References

Defunct motor vehicle manufacturers of England
Coachbuilders of the United Kingdom
Companies based in Northampton